Chain is the third studio album by the American rock band Pylon, released in 1990. It was released after a seven-year hiatus. R.E.M. had lobbied the band to record again, suggesting that Pylon could use R.E.M.'s practice space.

Critical reception

Robert Christgau thought that Pylon's "low registers, deliberate silences, and inexorably unmechanical beat all feed a muscular musical solidity with no real parallels—10 years after, the only band that sounds remotely similar is the Gang of Four." Trouser Press wrote: "While retaining the band’s traditional bite, Chain gets more melody and texture from [Vanessa] Briscoe-Hay's singing and Randy Bewley's sharp guitar jabs." Newsday noted the "monomaniacal infatuation with thick bass notes and a steady, pneumatic beat." The Washington Post determined that "there's still plenty of bounce in the band's sleek, steel-springed sound."

Track listing
All songs written and arranged by Pylon.
"Look Alive" – 4:19
"Catch" – 3:37
"B-Complex" – 2:25
"Sugarpop" – 3:25
"There It Is" – 3:32
"Springtime" – 3:38
"This / That" – 3:02
"Go" – 3:57
"Crunch" – 3:39
"Very Right" – 3:49
"Metal" – 2:50
"Outside" – 2:47
"Sloganistic" – 2:36

Personnel
Vanessa Ellison – vocals
Randy Bewley – guitars
Michael Lachowski – bass
Curtis Crowe – drums

References

Pylon (band) albums
1990 albums
Albums produced by Scott Litt